Manuel Solis (born 10 May 1920) was a Mexican cyclist. He competed in the individual and team road race events at the 1948 Summer Olympics.

References

External links
 

1920 births
Possibly living people
Mexican male cyclists
Olympic cyclists of Mexico
Cyclists at the 1948 Summer Olympics